Izki is a town in the region Ad Dakhiliyah, northeastern Oman. It is located at c.  altitude, and has a population of 35,173 (2003 census).

Geography 
Izki lies at the end of a route from Muscat to Nizwa. The route goes through Sama'il Valley, which divides Al Hajar Mountains into the Eastern and Western Hajar subranges.

History 

Legendarily, Izki is Oman's oldest city. Popularly revered 'oldest cities' are claimed the world over, the historicity of which usually rests on local pride. Its ancient aflaj (water canals) probably nourished such beliefs. The twin walled towns, Izki/al-Yemen and al-Nizar, differ from each other in size and appearance. The former presently has half of the surface area as the latter. In 1908 the estimated number of houses in al-Nizar at 450, and in al-Yemen at 350, which contradicts this. Al-Nizar is still inhabited; al-Yemen has been deserted since prior to 1980, but the owners still care for their own houses. The present appearance, especially the regular streets, results from the 18th century destruction and rebuilding of al-Yemen.

Early Iron Age Izki appears to find mention in cuneiform texts. According to Neoassyrian sources, in 640 BCE, "Pade, king of Qade, who lives in Izke…sent envoys to cultivate good relations [and a state contract] burdened with gifts. They travelled six months, came to me [Aššurbanipal], asked of my condition and beseeched my rule." Some believe that Izki was mentioned in Neoassyrian cuneiform texts from Nineveh.

Serious archaeological fieldwork began in Izki with J. Schreiber (2007). He strove to contextualise this centre amongst other large oases in Oman by means of archaeological survey. In order to reach this goal, he studied the different contexts of key sites in Central Oman first hand as a pottery specialist. The poor preservation of such continuously occupied sites scared off most archaeologists. In his survey J. Schreiber tallied in and immediately around the old twin towns 1045 sites (2007: 124) ranging from the Hafit to Islamic periods.

In 2011 excavation and survey partly confirmed Schreiber's results. The town contains the remains of the entire pre-Islamic period. Numerous were the finds of the Early Iron Age and Late Iron Age. Particularly eroded and disturbed was al-Nizar. Excavation of the highest part of Al-Yemen revealed an older mosque, presumably that destroyed during the civil war (886-970 AD).

On the other side of the Wadi Khalfayn lies a large cemetery which contains pottery sherds of the Samad Late Iron Age, but of other periods as well. The graves are mostly of this period.

References

External links
University of Heidelberg
HeidICON

Sources
D.T. Potts From Qadê to Mazûn: Four Notes on Oman, c. 700 to 700 AD, Journal of Oman Studies 8.1, 1985, 81–95.
Juergen Schreiber, Transformationsprozesse in Oasensiedlungen Omans. Die Vorislamische Zeit am Beispiel Von Izki, Nizwa und dem Jebel Akhdar, internet dissertation, Munich 2007.
URL: http://edoc.ub.uni-muenchen.de/7548/

Paul Yule, Cross-roads – Early and Late Iron Age South-eastern Arabia, Abhandlungen Deutsche Orient-Gesellschaft, vol. 30, Wiesbaden 2014, 29-30 Fig. 10 
Paul Yule, Excavation and Prospection in Izkī and Neighbouring Areas of Central Oman 2011, in Archaeological Research in the Sultanate of Oman, Der Anschnitt, 2015, 179‒203.

Populated places in Oman
Archaeological sites in Oman